John Giles Whitbourn (1885 – 1936) was an English professional footballer who played as a goalkeeper for Sunderland.

References

1885 births
1936 deaths
People from Farnham
English footballers
Association football goalkeepers
South Bank F.C. players
Sunderland A.F.C. players
Tottenham Hotspur F.C. players
Leyton F.C. players
English Football League players